Persicaria attenuata is a species of flowering plant native to Australia and Asia. It typically grows in wet land or streams.

References

Flora of New South Wales
Perennial plants
attenuata